An American Affair is a 1997 Canadian thriller film directed by Sebastian Shah and written by Judd Laurence and Arshad Shah. It stars Corbin Bernsen, Jayne Heitmeyer, Maryam d'Abo and Robert Vaughn.

Plot 
Sam Brady is a politically ambitious district attorney who has a rivalry with a federal senator and frames his son as drug dealer. He falls in love with two women – Barbara and Genevieve  – who are close friends with each other. Genevieve becomes pregnant after having sex with him and he secretly marries her; shortly after she loses the baby. Being caught by Genevieve in the act of having sex with Barbara, he accidentally kills his wife in the ensuing argument, and buries, with Barbara's assistance, Genevieve's body at a downtown construction site. In the end, it turns out Genevieve is still alive and was conspiring with Barbara and the senator.

Cast 
 Corbin Bernsen as Sam Brady/John Crawford
 Robert Vaughn as Professor Michaels
 Maryam d'Abo as Genevieve
 Jayne Heitmeyer as Barbara 
 Thomas G. Waites as Mulroney
 Rob Stewart as Dave Norton
 Pierre Lenoir as Spaulding

External links 
 
 An American Affair, MoviesPlanet.

1997 films
1990s thriller drama films
1990s English-language films
Canadian thriller drama films
English-language Canadian films
1997 drama films
1990s Canadian films